The Carlos Arvelo Municipality (named after Dr. Carlos Arvelo) is one of the 14 municipalities (municipios) that makes up the Venezuelan state of Carabobo and, according to the 2011 census by the National Institute of Statistics of Venezuela, the municipality has a population of 150,277. The town of Güigüe is the shire town of the Carlos Arvelo Municipality.

Geography 
The Carlos Arvelo Municipality is located in the southeastern part of Carabobo State. It is limited to the north by the Lake of Valencia and the Municipality the Guayos, to the west the Municipality of Valencia, to the South the State of Guárico and to the east the State of Aragua.

The Carlos Arvelo Municipality is integrated by the Güigüe Urban Parish (capital Güigüe) and the Belén Non-Urban Parish (capital Belen) and the Tacarigua Non-Urban Parish (capital Tacarigua). The north of the municipality is mostly plain, unlike the central and southern part of the municipality, which is mountainous.

Climate
Minimum monthly temperature in the Carlos Arvelo municipality lies between 12.3 and 22.1 °C, while maximum temperature is between 24.4 and 33.9 °C. Total annual precipitation fluctuates between 932 and 1395 mm. Most rain falls between June and August, while the driest quarter comprises January to March.

Demographics
The Carlos Arvelo Municipality, according to a 2011 population estimate by the National Institute of Statistics of Venezuela, has a population of 150,277 (up from 124,344 in 2001). This amounts to 6.7% of the state's population.

By Parish

By Year

Politics and Government

Mayors

Municipality council 
Term 2013-2017

See also 
Municipalities of Venezuela

References

External links 
carlosarvelo-carabobo.gov.ve 

Municipalities of Carabobo